Viktor Zimin may refer to:
Viktor Zimin (politician) (1962–2020), Russian politician, Head of the Republic of Khakassia
Viktor Zimin (football coach) (born 1950), Russian football coach